Mary Data Uranta is a Nigerian film and television actress, producer, model, singer, and businesswoman.

Mary Data Uranta was born and raised in Port Harcourt city, Rivers State, Nigeria. she competed in beauty pageant Miss Niger Delta, where she achieved the rank of first runner-up. The first acting role she got was in the year 2000 in the film, Girls Hostel. In 2006, she received more significant attention with a leading role in the Nollywood movie, Secret Mission. She also featured in other films including Love Doctor, Critical Passion, Pradah, Secret Shadow, and Blood Game.

Aside from being an actress, Uranta is an entrepreneur through her own movie production company. She established the Mary Uranta Foundation, a charity organisation which helps improve the lives of underprivileged children in Opobo Rivers State. Her contributions to the film industry has earned her a City People Award, Best of Nollywood Award nomination and the African Youth Ambassador Award.

Early life and education
Uranta grew up primarily in Port Harcourt, the capital city of Rivers State. She has seven siblings and four step-brothers. Describing her upbringing, Uranta commented that she "had a great childhood. I never had it rough or tough growing up. Fine, I'm from an average home. But it's never been bad. I had all I wanted as a child[...]we were one happy family."

Although Uranta was born a Pentecostal Christian, she attended Roman Catholic schools, including Sacred Heart Nursery And Primary School before attending the Holy Rosary Girls Secondary School in Port Harcourt. There, she took an interest in both dancing and stage-acting and would gain a Dance and Drama scholarship upon graduation.

Uranta later enrolled at Rivers State University of Science and Technology. She had aspired to go for a course related to her dream career (acting), but ended up studying Secretarial Administration. She had also placed first runner-up in the Miss Niger Delta contest.

Career 
Uranta's journey of acting started with a minor guest role in the Ndubisi Okoh-directed film, Girls Hostel, alongside Uche Jombo. she won the role after her first film audition. Subsequently, Uranta played roles in films such as Paul and Silas, War of Roses, Silver Spoon, and Church Committee before taking a break to complete her education.
In 2006, Uranta received her first big break role appearing as Ngozi Ezeonu's younger sister in the movie Secret Mission. Her other Nollywood films include Tea or Coffee, Tears of a Princess, Baits of Doom, The Professionals, Real Passion, Mistress, The Darkest Link, Love Doctor, Critical Passion, Pradah, Secret Shadow, and Blood Game.

Mary Uranta holds a postgraduate diploma in Theatre—a branch of performing arts—from the London School of Arts Academy. 
In October 2011, Uranta received the African Youth Ambassador Award for her contributions to Nollywood. The following year, she landed a Best of Nollywood Award nomination for her role in the film Mistress, and at the 4th City People Awards on 14 July 2013, she won the City People Award for Best Actress. That same year, Uranta launched 50th Academy, a film production company created to aid the industry's growth, and the Mary Uranta Foundation which caters for the welfare of deprived children in Opobo. She also became the new face of RedKarpet Photography based in Port Harcourt.

Filmography

See also
 List of Nigerian actors
 List of Nigerian film producers
 List of Nigerian film directors

References

External links

Year of birth missing (living people)
Living people
21st-century Nigerian actresses
Actresses from Port Harcourt
Nigerian stage actresses
Nigerian film actresses
Nigerian television actresses
Nigerian film producers
Rivers State University alumni
21st-century Nigerian women singers
Nigerian Christians
Singers from Port Harcourt
Nigerian female models
Nigerian businesspeople in retailing
21st-century Nigerian businesswomen
21st-century Nigerian businesspeople
Businesspeople from Port Harcourt
Beauty pageant contestants from Rivers State
Holy Rosary College alumni
Nigerian beauty pageant contestants
Nigerian film award winners